Mattia De Rigo (born 13 March 2001) is an Italian professional footballer who plays as a forward for Serie D club Chievo Sona.

Career
De Rigo joined to Virtus Entella in 2018. On 31 January 2020, as a youth, he was loaned to Torino. He made his Serie C debut, as a late substitute, on 23 December 2018 against Juventus U23.

For the 2020–21 season, he was loaned to Virtus Verona. On 25 July 2021, the loan was extended one year.

Honours
Virtus Entella
 Serie C: 2018–19 (Group A)

References

External links
 
 

2001 births
Living people
Italian footballers
Association football forwards
Serie C players
Serie D players
Virtus Entella players
Virtus Verona players